Ulakhan-Ebya (Ulaxan Ebe) is a rural locality (a selo), and one of two settlements in Khoptoginsky Rural Okrug of Churapchinsky District in the Sakha Republic, Russia, in addition to Diring, the administrative center of the Rural Okrug. Its population as of the 2010 Census was 53; down from 73 recorded in the 2002 Census.

References

Notes

Sources
Official website of the Sakha Republic. Registry of the Administrative-Territorial Divisions of the Sakha Republic. Churapchinsky District. 

Rural localities in Churapchinsky District